Korean Blockbuster Movies are Korean movies which have a large impact on the film industry. Shiri is one example of a Korean blockbuster film.

Meaning 
The meaning of "blockbuster" is originally from the Second World War. The term arose during World War II as a large bomb, so powerful that it was capable of destroying an entire city block of buildings. After the war ended, "blockbuster" was adopted by the advertising industry including film industry in the 1950s and added it to their arsenal of superlatives alongside "astounding," "incredible" and "revolutionary." Thus, the term is used to represent big impact that a film brings to film industry. In Hollywood, blockbuster films first came out in 1950s, supported by enormous amount of money. Starting from Jaws and followed by Star Wars, blockbuster films in Hollywood became very influential. With better equipment, techniques and famous actors, films attracted many people and brought a big financial success.

History 
In 1985, South Korea made the fifth amendment to Cinema Law. It switched the industry from an approval system to a registration system. At the time there were very few groups producing and creating films but then newer companies began to rise with the introduction to this amendment. Even with the amendment and more domestic movies being produced, Hollywood movies still dominated Korean Cinema. Then as a reaction to improve domestic film’s success in 1993 a domestic quota started to become enforced which ensured that domestic films would be screened for at least 146 days a year. But domestic films continued to have a lower market share compared to foreign films. 

In 1999, Shiri marked a change in the Korean film industry when it defeated Titanic creating change for a rise in the appeal of domestic films. A Korean film scholar even describes the box office competition as a war between South Korea and the US. After the success, there was a rise in national sentiment in choosing domestic films over foreign ones. Shiri was also one of the first budget films whose budget was taken care of by Samsung. Kang Je Gyu mentioned in an interview that after Shiri, people saw filmmaking as a business and the value towards it. Chaebol companies like Samsung began to join in on the film industry around 1992 and with the success of Shiri, were willing to invest more. Chaebols then became involved in the entire processes of the film industry especially helping the distribution. It also helped that with a new leadership in government there was more interest in making films a cultural product to be shared overseas who provided incentives to create and invest in films. The distribution of domestic films became higher because Chaebols wanted more people to watch the movies that they invested in which caused them to create multiplex cinemas.

Shiri featured shootouts on urban streets, exploding buildings, car chases, ticking bombs, and other narrative and visual clichés of big-budget action films from Hollywood. At the same time, it incorporated a melodramatic love story, which was very common and popular theme in Korean films and dramas. The film borrowed liberally from the model of the Hollywood blockbusters, but in addressing Korean themes it sought to be recognized and accepted as a local work. It offered big budget spectacle, special effects, star power, and a politically resonant theme. These factors turned the film into something more special than imported Hollywood blockbuster films, and the film became one of the most popular films in Korea and was successful financially. Shiri’s most lasting effect may have been to impart to the industry a sense of expanding possibilities and self-confidence because it opened a door for Korean blockbuster films.

After the release of Shiri, it allowed for more blockbusters to come out and continued because of interest and a future of possible investments. Blockbuster production halted after a few losses but then saw another rise in 2004 with the release of Taegukgi and Silmido. With the confidence that Korean films can compete against Hollywood films, other blockbuster films started to come out. The second blockbuster film that had a big impact and success was JSA. JSA featured a well-known cast, a large budget, and a politically timely theme centered on North-South relations. If Shiri more obviously utilized Hollywood conventions to stage and explore Korea-specific themes, JSA displays a wider range of influences in presenting its complex story. One of important milestones that JSA achieved was that it used the unique theme, which could not be found in Hollywood films. JSA differentiated itself from Hollywood blockbuster films and established its own genre. It was with Shiri and JSA, both of which staked early claims to blockbuster status in their pre-releasing marketing that the concept of the Korean blockbuster began to take shape.

Rise of a new generation 
During the Korean blockbuster era, the members of the 386 generation emerged as leading directors of blockbuster movies. The directors of 386 Generation specifically filled this role as they had film education backgrounds and even some were educated abroad. Because of changing governments they also did not have to worry about censorship. They also helped influence the common themes that were present in blockbuster movies. Due to them growing up in a more political tumultuous time in Korea, they were allowed to explore themes that could have not happened before with censorship. Another aspect is this generation also tried to incorporate their own culture into their movies. They have been known to use their culture and history for their own commercial gain. Kang Je Gyu and Park Chan Wook who directed some important Korean blockbuster movies like Shiri and Joint Security Area are part of this generation. Other notable names are Bong Joon Ho, Kim Sung Su and Kwak Kyu Taek who were also directors of early blockbuster films.

Common themes 
In the time of Korean blockbusters, anti-Americanism and national division are popular themes used by the directors. These themes differ from other cinemas and appeal to the history and current issues of the Korean people.

National division 
Joint Security Area, Shiri and Taegukgi, Welcome to Dongmakgol are notable blockbuster films that touch upon the division of Korea. They all deal with the North Korea and South Korea's relationship with each other. JSA, Shiri, Taegukgi and Welcome to Dongmakgol have a common theme of brotherhood. Characters can be brothers, co-workers, soldiers but all develop or already share a strong relationship. With the rise of blockbuster movies, the directors choose to view their post-war life as a tragedy and choose to humanize the North Koreans. Most characters as well do not have a happy ending. The broken relationships between bonds of the characters is supposedly an allegory to the division between two countries that once were one.

Anti-Americanism 
A prime example of this theme is The Host by director Bong Joon Ho. His blockbuster movie was inspired by a real life case where a mortician employed by the US Air Force ordered to dump toxic embalming fluid down the drain. This drain led to the Han River which caused a controversy. Cho Jin Hee explains that in the film The Host, there are inferences and allusions to the US presence in South Korea. The film even begins with a scene similar to the actual case. However, Nikki Lee points out that although it uses a real-life incident, the Host is not overtly political or nationalistic and does not take a particular stance. Bong Joon Ho himself however even admits that the anti-American element was not a focus of the film but he feels that the South Korean audiences and few critics enjoyed it.

References

 포화속으로
 쉬리
 Korean Blockbusters

Cinema of South Korea